Little Falls is an unincorporated community in Monongalia County, West Virginia, United States.

The community was named after a small waterfall near the original town site.

References

Unincorporated communities in Monongalia County, West Virginia
Unincorporated communities in West Virginia